Colobothea cassandra is a species of beetle in the family Cerambycidae. It was described by Dalman in 1823. It is known from Brazil.

References

cassandra
Beetles described in 1823
Beetles of South America